Israel competed in the 2017 Summer Deaflympics which was held in Samsun, Turkey and they sent a delegation of just 6 participants for the event. This was the 15th appearance for Israel in the Deaflympics after making its debut way back in 1993. The Israeli team managed to receive the solitary bronze medal in the Men's Shooting. This was the second overall medal won by Israel (after 24 years) in their Deaflympic history after clinching a bronze medal in the 1993 Summer Deaflympics.

Participants

Medal table

Medalists

Shooting 

Israeli deaf male shooter, Yanko Saar clinched the bronze medal for the nation in the 50 meters rifle prone with an aggregate of 180.2. He became the 1st Israeli individual athlete to win a medal in Deaflympics history.

References

External links 
Deaflympics

Israel at the Deaflympics
2017 in Israeli sport
Nations at the 2017 Summer Deaflympics